Sir Arthur Chichester, 3rd Baronet (c. 1662–1718), of Youlston Park, Devon was an English landowner and politician who sat in the House of Commons in two periods between 1685 and 1718.

 
Chichester was the second son of Sir John Chichester, 1st Baronet and his second wife, Mary Colly. He succeeded to the baronetcy on the death of his brother Sir John Chichester, 2nd Baronet in September 1680. He married Elizabeth Drewe, daughter of Thomas Drewe of Broadhembury Grange on 15 April 1684. In 1684, having sold the family estate of Raleigh and acquired a new one at Youlston, near Barnstaple, he became a freeman of Barnstaple.

In 1685, Chichester was elected Member of Parliament for Barnstaple  and was re-elected to the Convention parliament in 1689. He did not stand in 1690 and remained out of parliament until returned for Barnstaple again at the 1713 general election. He was returned unopposed again at the 1715 general election.

Chichester died on 3 February 1718. He had four sons and six daughters. He was succeeded in the baronetcy by his son John who was also MP for Barnstaple.

References

1662 births
1718 deaths
English MPs 1685–1687
English MPs 1689–1690
British MPs 1713–1715
British MPs 1715–1722
Members of the Parliament of Great Britain for English constituencies
Baronets in the Baronetage of England
Chichester family